Elena Vladimirovna Dolgopolova (born January 23, 1980) is a Russian gymnast, who competed in the 1996 Olympics in Atlanta, Georgia, and won a silver medal with her team. She was also in the running for the 2000 team, but was left out due to injury. A specialist on vaults, she posted the 1996 team's highest score on this apparatus. Her teammates in 1996 included Svetlana Khorkina, Rozalia Galiyeva, and Dina Kotchetkova.

Career
At the 1993 Junior European Championships, Dolgopolova finished thirteenth in the all-around and fifth on beam.

At the 1995 American Cup she finished sixth in the all-around. Dolgopolova competed at the 1995 World Championships. She finished fourth with her team.

Dolgopolova was selected for the 1996 Russian Olympic Team. After the compulsories, Russia was in first place. However, they were knocked into second by the United States after optionals.

At the 1997 World Artistic Gymnastics Championships Dolgopolova won a silver medal with her team. She also finished seventh on vault with a score of 9.331.

She competed at the 1998 European Championships. During qualification she scored 8.643 on vault and 9.187 on floor. The Russian team finished second behind Romania. At the 1998 Goodwill Games she won a silver medal on vault.

Competitive history

See also

List of Olympic female gymnasts for Russia

References

External links
 
 
 List of competitive results at Gymn Forum

1980 births
Living people
Russian female artistic gymnasts
Olympic gymnasts of Russia
Gymnasts at the 1996 Summer Olympics
Olympic silver medalists for Russia
People from Volzhsky, Volgograd Oblast
Olympic medalists in gymnastics
Medalists at the 1996 Summer Olympics
Medalists at the World Artistic Gymnastics Championships
Goodwill Games medalists in gymnastics
Competitors at the 1998 Goodwill Games
Sportspeople from Volgograd Oblast
21st-century Russian women